Here is a list of episodes from the first season of the American television detective series Columbo.

Broadcast history

The season originally aired Wednesdays at 8:30-10:00 pm (EST) as part of The NBC Wednesday Mystery Movie.

DVD release
The season was released on DVD by Universal Home Video. The DVD includes the two pilot movies: Prescription: Murder and Ransom for a Dead Man.

Episodes

References

Columbo 01
1971 American television seasons
1972 American television seasons